The 2011 Stanley Cup Finals was the championship series of the National Hockey League's (NHL) , and the culmination of the 2011 Stanley Cup playoffs. The Eastern Conference champion Boston Bruins defeated the Western Conference champion Vancouver Canucks four games to three. The Bruins ended a 39-year Stanley Cup drought with the win. Bruins goaltender Tim Thomas was awarded the Conn Smythe Trophy as the Most Valuable Player of the playoffs.

The Canucks had home ice advantage in the Finals by virtue of winning the Presidents' Trophy as the team that finished with the best regular season record (117 points). They were also the first Canadian team to have home ice advantage in the Finals since the Montreal Canadiens had it for the 1993 Stanley Cup Finals. 

On June 1, 2011, NHL commissioner Gary Bettman made an announcement that Colin Campbell would be stepping down as the league's head disciplinarian to be replaced by former player Brendan Shanahan, though Campbell would continue in his job as director of hockey operations. Mike Murphy, the NHL vice-president of hockey operations, had already been put in charge of disciplinary matters for the Finals, nonetheless there were concerns raised about Campbell's impartiality in handing out discipline since his son, Gregory, was an active player on the Boston Bruins roster.

The first game of the series was held on June 1, while the seventh game was played on June 15. The games varied widely between those played in Vancouver and those in Boston. Prior to game seven, the Bruins had managed to score only two goals in three games played in Vancouver, against 17 scored in three games at Boston. On the other hand, while posting two shutouts in Vancouver, Canucks goaltender Roberto Luongo was replaced with the backup Cory Schneider twice in three games in Boston. It was the fourth consecutive Stanley Cup Finals in which the deciding game was won by the road team. The Bruins scored almost three times the number of total goals as the Canucks, (23–8 in the series), but the Canucks won three games. The eight goals scored by Vancouver is the lowest number of goals scored by any team in a seven-game series in NHL history. The Canucks averaged 1.25 goals per game at home in Vancouver and one goal per game on the road, while the Bruins averaged almost six goals per game at home in Boston, and 1.5 goals per game on the road. In the seven games, the Bruins averaged roughly 3.3 goals per game, while the Canucks averaged 1.14 goals per game.

Paths to the Finals

Boston Bruins

The Bruins finished the regular season as the Northeast Division champion with 103 points, earning the #3 seed in the Eastern Conference playoffs. In their 33rd postseason meeting, Boston eliminated their bitter rivals, the Montreal Canadiens, in the first round of the playoffs in seven games. The Bruins went on to sweep the Philadelphia Flyers in the second round, outscoring the Flyers 20–7 in four games. Later, in the Eastern Conference Finals, Boston defeated the Tampa Bay Lightning in seven games.

This was the eighteenth appearance in the Stanley Cup Finals for the Bruins, and their first since , when they lost in five games to the Edmonton Oilers. It also allowed Boston to join Philadelphia as being the only cities to have had all of their teams play in each of the four major North American professional sports leagues' title rounds since 2000, following the Patriots in Super Bowls XXXVI in 2002, XXXVIII in 2004, XXXIX in 2005, XLII in 2008, XLVI in 2012, XLIX in 2015, LI in 2017, LII in 2018, and LIII in 2019. In addition, Boston beat out Philadelphia for playing in all of the "big" league championship rounds in the shortest time in the new millennium, as it took 9 years for Philadelphia to achieve this feat; Boston needed only three years and eight months. The Bruins would also play in the 2013 Stanley Cup Finals, so from 2004 to 2015 all four Boston major league teams have each reached the championship rounds at least twice and also won at least once during a decade from 2001 to 2011. From 2007 to 2022, all four Boston teams have each reached the championship rounds at least three times. Following the 2011 Stanley Cup Finals, Boston Globe columnist Dan Shaughnessy ranked all seven championships during the decade and ranked the Bruins' 2011 Stanley Cup triumph as third, behind only the Patriots winning Super Bowl XXXVI (second) and the Red Sox winning the 2004 World Series (first).

Vancouver Canucks

The Canucks, in their 41st season (including 2004–05 lockout), finished the regular season with the best record at 117 points, winning their first Presidents' Trophy in team history, and the Northwest Division championship. In the first round of the playoffs, the Canucks met the Chicago Blackhawks for the third consecutive postseason, having lost both previous series in six games. After Vancouver won the first three games, Chicago won the next three to force a game seven. Vancouver won the seventh game in overtime on a goal by Alex Burrows to avoid becoming the fourth team in NHL history to lose a series after taking a 3–0 series lead. The second round saw the Canucks eliminate the Nashville Predators in six games, with each game in that series decided by just a single goal (with the exception of an empty net goal scored by Vancouver in Game 4). Vancouver then went on to defeat the San Jose Sharks in the Western Conference Finals in five games.

This was Vancouver's third appearance in the Stanley Cup Finals.

With Vancouver having hosted the 2010 Winter Olympics, the Canucks hoped to mirror what had happened following the other two Olympic Games held in Canada, in which the host city's NHL team won the Stanley Cup the following year. Montreal hosted the 1976 Summer Olympics and the following year, the Canadiens won the Stanley Cup.

Triple Gold Club
Center Patrice Bergeron became the twenty-fifth player to enter the "Triple Gold Club", consisting of individuals who have won the Stanley Cup along with gold medals at the Winter Olympics, and World Championships, as a result of the Bruins winning the series. Bergeron also won gold medals as a teammate of Vancouver Canucks' goaltender Roberto Luongo at the 2004 Worlds and 2010 Olympics with Team Canada. Luongo – who also won the 2003 Worlds – would have become the first goaltender ever to enter the "Triple Gold Club", had the Canucks won. Both Luongo and Bergeron later got a second Olympic gold in the 2014 Winter Olympics .

Alternatively, Bergeron has also won a gold medal at the 2005 IIHF World Junior Championships, joining fellow Canadians Sidney Crosby, Jonathan Toews, Chris Pronger, Joe Sakic, and Scott Niedermayer as the only players to have won the Stanley Cup and gold medals at the Olympics, World Championships and the World Juniors.

Game summaries
 Number in parenthesis represents the player's total in goals or assists to that point of the entire four rounds of the playoffs

Game one

Raffi Torres's goal with 18.5 seconds left in regulation broke a scoreless tie to give the Canucks the victory. The entire game was seen as a duel between the two opposing goaltenders; both Vancouver's Roberto Luongo and Boston's Tim Thomas were Vezina Trophy finalists for the 2010–11 season. Thomas stopped 33 of 34 shots while Luongo made 36 saves for his third shutout of the 2011 playoffs. Both of Luongo's two previous shutouts of the 2011 playoffs had also occurred in a game one (a 2–0 victory against Chicago in the first round, and a 1–0 victory against Nashville in the second round). This was the first time since  that the opening game of the Cup Finals was scoreless through two periods.

Both teams killed off all penalties in the game, including a five-on-three power play Boston had in the second period, and a double minor high-sticking penalty called on Vancouver's Daniel Sedin in the first. At the end of the first period, Vancouver's Alex Burrows was called for a double minor roughing penalty on Boston's Patrice Bergeron, while Bergeron also got a roughing minor. Replays showed that Burrows could have bit Bergeron's finger, but the evidence was inconclusive. Despite Bergeron's pleading to the referees, no additional penalty was assessed to Burrows. However, despite biting being a suspendable offense, Burrows did not receive a suspension from the NHL on the grounds that no conclusive evidence that Burrows actually bit Bergeron could be found.

Game two

In the second-fastest overtime in Stanley Cup Finals history, Alex Burrows scored 11 seconds into the first overtime to give Vancouver a 3–2 win. Burrows faked a shot, causing Boston goalie Tim Thomas to move out of position, then skated around the net to put the puck into the empty net for the game-winning goal; Thomas was not able to recover his position. This was Burrows's second goal of the game. He opened the scoring with a goal in the first period during the final seconds of a power play. Boston responded with two goals in the second period, one by Milan Lucic and a power play goal by Mark Recchi. However, Daniel Sedin tied the score at 2–2 about midway through the third period.

The game featured the return of Vancouver's Manny Malhotra, who had not played a game since March 16, when he suffered a severe eye injury after taking a puck to the face. Both Thomas and Roberto Luongo still had good games, stopping 30 of 33 shots and 28 of 30 shots, respectively. With his second period goal, 43-year-old Recchi became the oldest player to score in the Cup Finals.

Burrows led all players with three points, including his two goals and his assist on Sedin's goal. Before playing, Burrows promised his father that he would have a big game so that his controversial biting incident in the first game would be forgotten. Burrows' play only drew attention that he had not been suspended and was galling to Bruins fans as well as critics who did support a suspension. Analyst Mike Milbury was extremely vocal about the league's non-suspension during NBC's telecast, saying that it was "a disgraceful call by the league ... They're impacting this series by a non-call". Still, Boston head coach Claude Julien, Patrice Bergeron, and the rest of the Bruins refused to make it an excuse for not winning the game.

Before the game, the Boston Red Sox baseball club moved their game against the Oakland Athletics at Fenway Park from 7:10 p.m. EDT to 1:10 p.m. EDT to allow for Bruins fans to watch the game. This decision proved valuable as it took 14 innings for that game to end (ending at approximately 6:30 p.m. ET), pre-empting about 1/2 hour of NESN's pre-game Bruins coverage.

Game three

Boston scored four goals in the second period, and another four goals in the third, which resulted in an 8–1 rout. Mark Recchi scored two of them; Brad Marchand and Daniel Paille each scored shorthanded; and Andrew Ference, David Krejci, Chris Kelly and Michael Ryder each tallied one of the other four. Tim Thomas stopped 40 out of 41 shots, only allowing a third period goal by Jannik Hansen.

At 05:07 into the first period, Vancouver's Aaron Rome received a major penalty for interference and a game misconduct for a blindside hit to the head of Boston's Nathan Horton. Horton was taken off the ice on a stretcher and was then transported to a hospital for further observation. However, the Bruins did not score on the ensuing five-minute power play. Following a disciplinary hearing on June 7, Rome was given a four-game suspension for the late hit which assured that he'd miss the remainder of the 2011 playoffs, the first multi-game suspension in the history of the Stanley Cup Finals. Rome and the Canucks maintained that the play was a good hit that went bad, but the NHL determined that the hit came more than a second after Horton gave up the puck. The NHL considers a hit to be late if it comes more than half a second after a player gives up possession. A Boston Globe column by Dan Shaughnessy noted that Rome's hit on Horton inflamed the rivalry against Vancouver for that series, making it comparable to the long-running grudges that Boston's professional sports clubs held against other teams, saying "The Red Sox are playing the Yankees this week, but it is the Vancouver Canucks who '(expletive)' (rhymes with 'nuck')."

In contrast to game two, which featured only 10 minutes of penalties for the entire game, game three had 145 total penalty minutes, the most in a Cup Final game since 1990. The 8–1 score was the biggest goal differential in the Stanley Cup Finals since , when the Colorado Avalanche defeated the Florida Panthers in game two by the same score.

Game four

Tim Thomas made 38 saves and Rich Peverley scored two goals as Boston shut out Vancouver, 4–0, to even the series. Roberto Luongo, who stopped only 16 out of 20 shots, was replaced by backup goalie Cory Schneider after giving up the fourth Boston goal at 03:39 of the third period. Thomas' shutout was the first for the Bruins in a Stanley Cup Finals since Gerry Cheevers' 4–0 win over the Montreal Canadiens in game three of the 1978 Stanley Cup Finals.

Game five

Roberto Luongo made 31 saves and Maxim Lapierre scored the game's only goal to give Vancouver a 3–2 series lead. This was the second 1–0 victory for Vancouver in the Finals; game one ended with the same score. Lapierre's goal came at 04:35 into the third period. Kevin Bieksa's shot went wide and rebounded off the end boards to Lapierre on the other side of the net, who then beat Tim Thomas after the Boston goalie was unable to recover his position in time. Thomas made 24 saves in the loss.

Game six

Boston defeated Vancouver 5–2 in front of a roaring TD Garden crowd to force a deciding game seven, the 16th in Finals history. The Bruins scored four goals in a span of 4:14 in the first period, breaking the record for the quickest four goals tallied by one team in the Cup Finals. For the second time in the series, Roberto Luongo was replaced by backup goalie Cory Schneider; this came after Luongo gave up Boston's third goal at 08:35.

Vancouver's Mason Raymond suffered a fractured vertebra 20 seconds into the game on an awkward hit into the boards by Johnny Boychuk, and had to be taken to a hospital for treatment.

With the loss, the Canucks fell to 3–5 in the 2011 playoffs in games in which they had a chance to clinch a series with a win.

Game seven

In Boston's first-ever game seven of a Stanley Cup Finals, Tim Thomas made 37 saves as Boston shut out Vancouver, 4–0, to win the Stanley Cup. Patrice Bergeron and Brad Marchand each scored two of Boston's goals. Bergeron scored first at 14:37 in the first period, then had a shorthanded goal at 17:35 in the second. Marchand's first goal came at 12:13 of the second period; he then scored on an empty net late in the third. Roberto Luongo stopped 17 out of 20 shots in the loss. The game was the last of Mark Recchi's 22 year NHL career; he announced his retirement immediately afterward, during the post-game celebration.

Television
In Canada, the series was televised in English on CBC and in French on the cable network RDS. In the United States, NBC broadcast the first two and final three games, while Versus (now NBCSN) televised games three and four.

Ratings
Game one on NBC drew the best television ratings for a first game since game one of the 1999 Stanley Cup Finals, drawing a 3.2 rating, up 14 percent from game one of the  Finals. The rating was boosted by heavy interest in Boston's large market, which posted a 25.5/39, topping the 19.1/34 for game one of the 2010 NBA Finals between the Boston Celtics and the Los Angeles Lakers.

Games six, five and one are the third, fourth, and fifth most-watched CBC Sports programs with an average Canadian audience of 6.6 million, 6.1 million, and 5.6 million viewers respectively, after the men's ice hockey gold medal game between Canada and the United States at the 2002 Winter Olympics. Game seven was the highest rated game on both sides of the border; in Canada, it was second most-watched CBC Sports program, drawing an average of 8.76 million viewers and trailing only the men's gold medal game in ice hockey at the 2002 Winter Olympics; In the US, NBC's broadcast drew a 5.7 national overnight rating and a 10 share (numbers that equaled game seven of the 2003 Stanley Cup Finals), a number later updated to 8.5 million viewers, making the game the most-watched NHL broadcast in the US since 1973; in the Boston market alone, the broadcast pulled in a 43.4 rating and a 64 share.

Vancouver riots

The final game of the series attracted huge crowds on the streets of Vancouver who gathered to watch the game on outside monitors and cheer the home team on. Shortly before the game ended with the apparent loss for Vancouver, fires were set on West Georgia Street. After the game ended, cars were set on fire and fighting broke out. Soon, a riot was in progress in downtown Vancouver, with police cars set on fire, shops looted and attendant destruction of property. The damage was expected to be greater than the 1994 Vancouver riots that occurred after Vancouver lost the Stanley Cup Finals to the New York Rangers.

Officials
Referees: Dan O'Halloran, Dan O'Rourke, Kelly Sutherland, Stephen Walkom
Linesmen: Steve Miller, Jean Morin, Pierre Racicot, Jay Sharrers

Team rosters
Years indicated in boldface under the "Finals appearance" column signify that the player won the Stanley Cup in the given year.

Boston Bruins

Vancouver Canucks

Stanley Cup engraving

The 2011 Stanley Cup was presented to Boston Bruins' captain Zdeno Chara by NHL Commissioner Gary Bettman following the Bruins' 4–0 win over the Vancouver Canucks in the seventh game of the finals.

The following Bruins players and staff had their names engraved on the Stanley Cup

2010–11 Boston Bruins

See also

 2011 Stanley Cup playoffs

References
Inline citations

Bibliography

External links
 Official site

Stanley Cup Finals
2010–11 NHL season
Vancouver Canucks games
Boston Bruins games
 
Stanley Cup Finals
Stanley Cup Finals
Ice hockey competitions in Boston
Ice hockey competitions in Vancouver
Stanley Cup Finals
Stanley Cup Finals
Stanley Cup Finals
2010s in Vancouver